or  is a lake in the municipalities of Røyrvik and Lierne in Trøndelag county, Norway. The  lake lies just south of the large lake Limingen, and just west of the border with Sweden. It is the seventh largest lake in Norway.

Gudfjelløya
The island Gudfjelløya lies in Tunnsjøen lake. This makes Gudfjelløya the highest island on a lake in Norway.

References

Lierne
Røyrvik
Lakes of Trøndelag